This is an incomplete list of Statutory Instruments of the United Kingdom in 1965.

 Guildie Howes Mine (Locomotives and Diesel Vehicles) Special Regulations 1965 S.I. 1965/33
 Muirshiel Barytes Mine (Storage Battery Locomotives) Special Regulations 1965 S.I. 1965/120
 Transfer of Functions (Shipping and Construction of Ships) Order 1965 S.I. 1965/145
 The Road Vehicles (Index Marks) (Amendment) Regulations 1965 S.I. 1965/237
 Trunk Roads (40 m.p.h. Speed Limit) (No.6) Order 1965 S.I. 1965/305
 Secretary of State for Wales and Minister of Land and Natural Resources Order 1965 S.I. 1965/319
 Act of Sederunt (Rules of Court) (Consolidation and Amendment) 1965 S.I. 1965/321
 Barnsley (Water Charges) Order 1965 S.I. 1965/419
 The National Health Service (Regional Hospital Areas) Order 1965 S.I. 1965/527
 Water Resources (Licences) Regulations 1965 S.I. 1965/534
 Local Law (Greater London Council and Inner London Boroughs) Order 1965 S.I. 1965/540
 Post Office Register (Trustee Savings Banks) (Amendment) Regulations 1965 S.I. 1965/556
 The London Government Order 1965 S.I. 1965/654
 Merseyside Special Review Area Order 1965 S.I. 1965/905
 South East Lancashire Special Review Area Order S.I. 1965/906
 Industrial Tribunals (England and Wales) Regulations 1965 S.I. 1965/1101
 Diplomatic Privileges (Citizens of the United Kingdom and Colonies) (Amendment) Order 1965 S.I. 1965/1124
 Industrial Tribunals (Scotland) Regulations 1965 S.I. 1965/1157
 The East of Christchurch-Tredegar Park Motorway Connecting Roads Special Roads Scheme 1965 S.I. 1965/1247
 Dragonby Ironstone Mine (Diesel, Diesel-Electric and Storage Battery Vehicles) (Amendment) Special Regulations 1965 S.I. 1965/1299
 Trunk Roads (50 m.p.h. Speed Limit) (England) Order 1965 S.I. 1965/1346
 Common Investment Fund Scheme 1965 S.I. 1965/1467
 County Court Funds Rules 1965 S.I. 1965/1500
 Visiting Forces and International Headquarters (Application of Law) Order 1965 S.I. 1965/1536
 Coal and Other Mines (Mechanics and Electricians) Regulations 1965 S.I. 1965/1559
 Redburn Mine (Storage Battery Locomotives) Special Regulations 1965 S.I. 1965/1698
 Barnsley Water Order 1965 S.I. 1965/1728
 Rules of the Supreme Court 1965 S.I. 1965/1776
 Act of Adjournal (Criminal Legal Aid Fees Amendment) 1965 S.I. 1965/1788
 Redundancy Payments Pensions Regulations 1965 S.I. 1965/1932
 Industrial and Provident Societies Regulations 1965 S.I. 1965/1995
 County of Ross and Cromarty (River Lael Allt Gleann a' Mhadaidh) Water Order 1965 S.I. 1965/2102
 Town and Country Planning (Scotland) (New Town of East Kilbride) (Special Development) Order 1965 S.I. 1965/2118

External links
Legislation.gov.uk delivered by the UK National Archive
UK SI's on legislation.gov.uk
UK Draft SI's on legislation.gov.uk

See also
List of Statutory Instruments of the United Kingdom

Lists of Statutory Instruments of the United Kingdom
Statutory Instruments